Ha Sinan (born 10 January 1992 in Kunming, Yunnan) is a swimmer from China. She is listed as a member of China's team at the 2008 Olympics; however, she appears to have not swum at the Games.

Major achievements
2009 Asian Swimming Championships - 1st 4x200 Free Relay

References

1992 births
Living people
Chinese female freestyle swimmers
Swimmers from Yunnan
Sportspeople from Kunming
21st-century Chinese women